An electrical crimp is a type of solderless electrical connection.

Crimp connectors are typically used to terminate stranded wire. The benefits of crimping over soldering and wire wrapping include:
 A well-engineered and well-executed crimp is designed to be gas-tight, which prevents oxygen and moisture from reaching the metals (which are often different metals) and causing corrosion
 Because no alloy is used (as in solder) the joint is mechanically stronger
 Crimped connections can be used for cables of both small and large cross-sections, whereas only small cross-section wires can be used with wire wrapping
Crimping is normally performed by first inserting the terminal into the crimp tool. The terminal must be placed into the appropriately sized crimp barrel. The wire is then inserted into the terminal with the end of the wire flush with the exit of the terminal to maximize cross-sectional contact. Finally, the handles of the crimp tool are used to compress and reshape the terminal until it is cold-welded onto the wire.

The resulting connection may appear loose at the edges of the terminal, but this is desirable so as to not have sharp edges that could cut the outer strands of the wire. If executed properly, the middle of the crimp will be swaged or cold-formed.

More specialized crimp connectors are also used, for example as signal connectors on coaxial cables in applications at high radio frequencies (VHF, UHF) .

Crimped contacts are permanent (i.e. the connectors and wire ends cannot be reused).

History 
The technique of soldering wires has remained common for at least a century, however crimp terminals came into use in the middle of the 20th century. In 1953, AMP Incorporated (now TE Connectivity) introduced crimp barrel terminals, and in 1957 Cannon Brothers experimented with machined contacts integrating crimp barrels. During the 1960s, several standards for crimp connectors were published, including MS3191-1, MS3191-4 and MIL-T-22520. In 2010, the predominant standard for crimp connectors changed to MIL-DTL-22520.

Theory 
Crimp-on connectors are attached by inserting the stripped end of a stranded wire into a portion of the connector, which is then mechanically deformed by compressing (crimping) it tightly around the wire. The crimping is usually accomplished with special crimping tool such as crimping pliers. A key idea behind crimped connectors is that the finished connection should be gas-tight.

Effective crimp connections deform the metal of the connector past its yield point so that the compressed wire causes tension in the surrounding connector, and these forces counter each other to create a high degree of static friction which holds the cable in place. Due to the elastic nature of the metal in crimped connections, they are highly resistant to vibration and thermal shock.

Two main classes of wire crimps exist:
Closed barrel crimps have a cylindrical opening for a wire, and the crimping tool deforms the originally circular cross section of the terminal into some other shape. This method of crimping is less resilient to vibration.
Open barrel crimps have "ears" of metal that are shaped like a V or U, and the crimp terminal bends and folds them over the wire prior to swaging the wire to the terminal. Open-barrel terminals are claimed to be easier to automate because of avoiding the need to funnel stranded wire into the narrow opening of a barrel terminal.

In addition to their shape, crimped connectors can also be characterized by their insulation (insulated or non-insulated), and whether they crimp onto the conductor(s) of a wire (wire crimp) or its insulation (insulation crimp).

Crimp shapes 

 C crimp
 D crimp
 F crimp (a.k.a. B crimp)
 O crimp
 W crimp
 Overlap/OVL crimp
 Oval (confined) crimp
 Four-Mandrel crimp
 Mandrel (crescent) crimp
 Mandrel crimp-narrow (indented)
 Hexagonal crimp
 Mandrel (indent) crimp
 Square crimp
 Trapezoidal crimp
 Trapezoidal indent crimp
 Trapezoidal crimp front
 Tyco crimp
 Western crimp

Applications 
Crimped connections are common alternatives to soldered connections. There are complex considerations for determining which method is appropriatecrimp connections are sometimes preferred for these reasons:
 Easier, cheaper, or faster to reproduce reliably in large-scale production
 Fewer dangerous or harmful processes involved in termination (soldered connections require aggressive cleaning, high heat, and possibly toxic solders)
 Potentially superior mechanical characteristics due to strain relief and lack of solder wicking

Crimped connectors fulfill numerous uses, including termination of wires to screw terminals, blade terminals, ring/spade terminals, wire splices, or various combinations of these. A tube-shaped connector with two crimps for splicing wires in-line is called a butt splice connector.

Single-wire crimp terminals 

 Blade or quick disconnect (e.g. Faston or Lucar)
 Bullet (e.g. Shur-Plug)
 Butt splice
 Flag tongue
 Rectangular tongue
 Hook tongue
 Spade tongue (flanged, short spring, long spring)
 Ring tongue (slotted, offset)
 Multiple stud
 Packard 56
 Pin (SAE/J928)
 Wire pin

Multipin connectors 

Crimping is also a common technique to join wires to a multipin connector, such as in Molex connectors or modular connectors.

Crimp plug-and-socket connectors can be classified as rear release or front release, referring to the side of the connector where the pins are anchored:
Front release contacts are released from the front (contact side) of the connector, and removed from the rear. The removal tool engages with the front portion of the contact and pushes it through to the back of the connector.
Rear release contacts are released and removed from the rear (wire side) of the connector. The removal tool releases the contacts from the rear and pulls the contact out of the retainer.

Coaxial connectors 
Crimp connections are used typically to fix connectors, such as BNC connectors, to coaxial cables quickly, as an alternative to soldered connections. Typically the male connector is crimp-fitted to a cable, and the female attached, often using soldered connections, to a panel on equipment. A special power or manual tool is used to fit the connector. Wire strippers which strip outer jacket, shield braid, and inner insulation to the correct lengths in one operation are used to prepare the cable for crimping.

Judging crimp quality 
A crimped connection will only be reliable if a number of criteria are met:
 All strands have been deformed enough to cold-flow into the terminal body
 The compression force is not too light, nor too strong
 The connector body is not overly deformed
 Wires must be in solid working condition, cannot have scrapes, nicks, severing or other damages
 Insulation should not show any signs of pinching, pulling, fraying, discoloration, or charring 
 Large voids are not left inside the crimp (caused by not enough wire inside the connector)
 The wire should have as many strands as possible, so that a few damaged or uninserted wires will not adversely affect the crimp density, and thus degrade the electrical and mechanical properties of the connection.

Micrographs of the crimped connections can be prepared to illustrate good and bad crimps for training and quality assurance purposes.  The assembled connection is cut in cross-section, polished and  washed in nitric acid to dissolve any copper dust that may be filling voids leading to a false indication of a good crimp.

Crimp tools 
A wide variety of crimping tools exist, and they are generally designed for a specific type and size of terminal. Handheld tools (sometimes called crimping pliers) are most common, which may be ratcheting. For mass production operations, automated devices are available.

Terminal insulation colors

References 

Electrical connectors